Violetta White Delafield, née Violetta Susan Elizabeth White, (1875–1949) was an American botanist, mycologist, scientific illustrator and horticulturist.

Early life
Violetta Susan White was born in Florence, Italy to expatriate American parents. She spent most of her childhood in southern France. In 1890, Violetta returned to the United States, where she began collecting mushrooms and studying mycology and botany.

Scientific work
Delafield was particularly interested in fungi, and her earliest illustrations date back to 1899. She specialised in gasteromycetes and many of her specimens were collected in New England and in the Hudson Valley.

At the start of the 20th century, Delafield published three scientific papers under her maiden name, V.S. White, on fungi of the Tylostomaceae and Nidulariaceae families in North America. She also cataloged fungi on Mount Desert Island, Maine, to supplement Edward Lothrop Rand's 1894 work Flora of Mount Desert Island. She also studied Geastrales, more commonly known as earthstars, for a manuscript that remained unpublished. Delafield worked with Lucien Underwood at the New York Botanical Garden where she became a registered investigator, and with Charles H. Peck of the New York State Museum. 

Delafield is credited with the discovery of several species of fungi, including eight species of Tulostoma (stalked puffballs). She corresponded with and borrowed mycological specimens from William Alphonso Murrill, the founder of the journal Mycologia. After her marriage, she devoted less time to scientific work but continued to collect specimens in several locations including Buck Hill Falls, Pennsylvania, the Catskills, New York and Litchfield, Connecticut.

Marriage and family
Violetta Susan White married John Ross Delafield (1874–1964) on 14 June 1904 in Manhattan and went on to have three children. John Ross Delafield was born in Fieldston, Bronx, to parents from wealthy, prominent Hudson Valley families. He graduated from Princeton University in 1896 and from Harvard Law School in 1899. The Delafields were related to the Livingston family, who established the country estate known as Montgomery Place, which became their main residence after 1921. Montgomery Place and its estate are now part of Bard College.

Montgomery Place
After her marriage, Delafield's focus shifted to horticulture and she was an active member of the Garden Club of America. She redesigned the gardens of Montgomery Place, adding several features including a terraced garden, a lily pond and a reflecting pool. She established several garden rooms which housed a rose garden, a herb garden, and a rock garden. A state of the art working greenhouse was added to the formal gardens in 1929, with underfloor heating to protect the plants from the cold. The greenhouse is now part of Bard Farm, the college's horticulture department.  In the 1930s, Delafield added a farm stand to the grounds, enabling farmers to sell their fresh produce by the road.

Selected publications
 
 
  (See Mount Desert Island.)

References

External links
 
"Bard College Montgomery Place Campus Collection: Mushroom Drawings of Violetta White Delafield" JSTOR
"Violetta White Delafield Mushroom CollectionN", New York Heritage Digital Collection

1875 births
1949 deaths
American mycologists
Women mycologists
19th-century American women scientists
20th-century American women scientists
Delafield family